David Churchill (born 18 August 1963) is a Canadian former butterfly and freestyle swimmer. He competed in three events at the 1984 Summer Olympics.

References

External links
 

1963 births
Living people
Canadian male butterfly swimmers
Canadian male freestyle swimmers
Olympic swimmers of Canada
Swimmers at the 1984 Summer Olympics
Swimmers from Calgary
Swimmers at the 1983 Pan American Games
Pan American Games medalists in swimming
Pan American Games silver medalists for Canada
Medalists at the 1983 Pan American Games